Sony Ericsson P990 is a smartphone and the successor of Sony Ericsson P910. The phone uses the UIQ 3 software platform, which is based upon Symbian OS 9.1. It was introduced on 11 October 2005, but had a long delayed market release only in August 2006.

The P990 has a numeric keypad that flips open to reveal a full QWERTY keyboard below the display, on the phone itself. This is a change from P910, where the keyboard is on the flip. The flip itself can be attached or detached using the screw and screwdriver found in the box. The phone is a UMTS (3G) and tri-band GSM phone supporting video calls through its front VGA camera. The touchscreen displays 262,114 colours (18-bit colour depth) with a resolution of 240x320 pixels. It also comes with a 2.0 Megapixel camera featuring autofocus and an FM/RDS radio. The P990 runs the Nexperia PNX4008 ARM9 208 MHz processor from Philips. The screen despite a smaller length (2.8 inch) than its predecessors is actually larger in area because of the increased resolution. The phone also improves over the P910 by including support for Wi-Fi, allowing users to connect to 802.11b wireless networks. You can browse the Web using the built in Opera browser. Additional features includes RSS feeds, online video streaming, Java ME support and Handwriting recognition.

Popularity
P990 was adopted for business and personal use. Quickoffice comes pre-installed with the firmware itself. New features like Business card scanner and Front Camera attracted many consumers.

Problems
 New interface
P990 was the major smartphone device launched after P910. It had the latest UIQ user interface 3, which was completely incompatible with previous device applications, such as those of the P900 and P910, so new applications had to be written. Hence, the device did not have as many applications as older devices had.

 Less RAM
The major issue of P990 was RAM, which was much less (64 MB), of which device used 48 MB in start up (OS) and only 16 MB was available for the user. This caused the phone to work slowly and crash frequently. Running multiple applications simultaneously was not possible due to lack of sufficient RAM. The latest update increased the available RAM, which solved most of the problems.

 Network hang
Network hang is the most prominent problem seen on P990. When the phone is kept idle for a certain time, the signal gets dropped. Only restarting the phone solves this problem. During the network hang, the phone seems perfect, but SMS and calls are dropped.

Latest firmware
Sony Ericsson updated the firmware, which made OS reduce its size up to 2 MB and gave the user 17 MB of memory to use. There were improvements seen in the phone after the software update. The phone seems stable after the latest update.

The latest firmware is R6E28 of both Generic World 1 and Generic World 2. Lot of issues were addressed since some branded phones were not allowed to update.
It was then possible to change the CDA of the phone with the use of third-party software like XS++.

See also 
 List of Sony Ericsson products
 List of UIQ 3 Phones

References

External links 
 Sony Ericsson P990i Support Page
 Sony Ericsson P990i Support Page (UK)
 Missing Sync for Symbian
 CDA & firmware versions
 Known Bugs 
  UIQ Developer Portal
 SE-UIQ 

Sony Ericsson smartphones
UIQ 3 Phones
Mobile phones introduced in 2005
Mobile phones with infrared transmitter